The far-right in Germany slowly reorganised itself after the fall of Nazi Germany and the dissolution of the Nazi Party in 1945. Denazification was carried out in Germany from 1945 to 1951 by the Allied forces of World War II, with an attempt of eliminating Nazism from the country. However, various far-right parties emerged post-war, with varying success. Most parties only lasted a few years before either dissolving or being banned, and explicitly far-right parties have never gained seats in the Bundestag (Germany's federal parliament) post-WWII. The closest was the hard-right Deutsche Rechtspartei (German Right Party), which attracted former Nazis and won five seats in the 1949 West German federal election and held these seats for four years, before losing them in the 1953 West German federal election. This was until the election of Alternative for Germany representatives to the Bundestag in 2017.

The National Democratic Party of Germany (NPD), founded in 1964, is the only national neo-Nazi political party remaining in Germany. The party won their first state representatives in the 2004 Saxony state election, then in the 2006 Mecklenburg-Vorpommern state election, and a seat in the 2014 European Parliament election. However, the party lost its last remaining seat at any level in the 2019 European Parliament election.

Definition 
"Far-right" is synonymous with the term "extreme right", or literally "right-extremist" (the German term used by the German intelligence service, the Verfassungsschutz), according to which neo-Nazism is a subclass, with its historical orientation at Nazism.

West Germany (1945–1990) 
In 1946 the Deutsche Rechtspartei was founded and in 1950 succeeded by the Deutsche Reichspartei. As the allied occupation of Germany ended in 1949 a number of new far-right parties emerged: The Socialist Reich Party, founded in 1949, the German Social Union (West Germany), the Free German Workers' Party, Nationalist Front and National Offensive.

In 1964, the National Democratic Party of Germany was founded, which continues to the present day.

Defunct parties 

 Deutsche Rechtspartei (1946–1950)
 Socialist Reich Party (1949–1952) banned
 Deutsche Reichspartei (1950–1964)
 German Social Union (1956–1962)
 Free German Workers' Party (1979–1995)
 Nationalist Front (1985–1992) banned
 German Alternative (1989–1992) banned
 National Offensive (1990–1992) banned

East Germany (1945–1990) 
East Germany (GDR) was founded under a different pretext than West Germany. As a socialist state, it was based on the idea that fascism was an extreme form of capitalism. Thus, it understood itself as an anti-fascist state (Article 6 of the GDR constitution) and anti-fascist and anti-colonialist education played an important role in schools and in ideological training at universities. In contrast to West Germany, organizations of the Nazi regime had always been condemned and their crimes openly discussed as part of the official state doctrine in the GDR. Thus, in the GDR, there was no room for a movement similar to the 1968 movement in West Germany, and GDR opposition groups did not see the topic as a major issue. Open right-wing radicalism was relatively weak until the 1980s. Later, smaller extremist groups formed (e.g. those associated with football violence). The government attempted to address the issue, but at the same time had ideological reasons not to do so openly as it conflicted with the self-image of a socialist society.

Germany (since 1990) 
In 1991, one year after German reunification, German neo-Nazis attacked accommodations for refugees and migrant workers in Hoyerswerda (Hoyerswerda riots), Schwedt, Eberswalde, Eisenhüttenstadt and Elsterwerda, and in 1992, xenophobic riots broke out in Rostock-Lichtenhagen. Neo-Nazis were involved in the murders of three Turkish girls in a 1992 arson attack in Mölln (Schleswig-Holstein), in which nine other people were injured.

German statistics show that in 1991, there were 849 hate crimes, and in 1992 there were 1,485 concentrated in the eastern Bundesländer. After 1992, the numbers decreased, although they rose sharply in subsequent years. In four decades of the former East Germany, 17 people were murdered by far right groups.

A 1993 arson attack by far-right skinheads on the house of a Turkish family in Solingen resulted in the deaths of two women and three girls, as well as in severe injuries for seven other people. In the aftermath, anti-racist protests precipitated massive neo-Nazi counter-demonstrations and violent clashes between neo-Nazis and anti-fascists.

In 1995, the fiftieth anniversary of the Bombing of Dresden in World War II, a radical left group, the Anti-Germans (political current) started an annual rally praising the bombing on the grounds that so many of the city's civilians had supported Nazism. Beginning in the late 1990s and early 2000s, Neo-Nazis started holding demonstrations on the same date. In 2009, the Junge Landsmannschaft Ostdeutschland  youth group of the NPD organised a march but surrounded by policemen, the 6,000 neo-Nazis were not allowed to leave their meeting point. At the same time, some 15,000 people with white roses assembled in the streets holding hands to demonstrate against Nazism, and to create an alternative “memorial day” of war victims.

In 2004, the National Democratic Party of Germany won 9.2% in the Saxony state election, 2004, and 1.6% of the nationwide vote in the German federal election, 2005. In the Mecklenburg-Vorpommern state election, 2006 the NPD received 7.3% of the vote and thus also state representation. In 2004, the NPD had 5,300 registered party members. Over the course of 2006, the NPD processed roughly 1,000 party applications which put the total membership at 7,000. The DVU has 8,500 members.

In 2007, the Verfassungsschutz (Federal German intelligence) estimated the number of potentially right extremist individuals in Germany was 31,000 of which about 10,000 were classified as potentially violent (gewaltbereit).

In 2008, unknown perpetrators smashed cars with Polish registrations and breaking windows in Löcknitz, a German town near the Polish city  Szczecin, where about 200 Poles live. Supporters of the NPD party were suspected to be behind anti-Polish incidents, per Gazeta Wyborcza.

In 2011, the National Socialist Underground was finally exposed in being behind the murders of 10 people of Turkish origins between 2000 and 2007.

In 2011, Federal German intelligence reported 25,000 right-wing extremists, including 5,600 neo-Nazis. In the same report, 15,905 crimes committed in 2010 were classified as far-right motivated, compared to 18,750 in 2009; these crimes included 762 acts of violence in 2010 compared to 891 in 2009. While the overall numbers had declined, the Verfassungsschutz indicated that both the number of neo-Nazis and the potential for violent acts have increased, especially among the growing number of Autonome Nationalisten ("Independent Nationalists") who gradually replace the declining number of Nazi Skinheads.

In the 2014 European Parliament election, the NPD won their first ever seat in the European Parliament with 1% of the vote. Jamel, Germany is a village known to be heavily populated with neo-Nazis.

According to interior ministry figures reported in May 2019, of an estimated 24,000 far-right extremists in the country, 12,700 Germans are inclined towards violence. Extremists belonging to Der Dritte Weg (the third way) marched through a town in Saxony on 1 May, the day before the Jewish remembrance of the Holocaust, carrying flags and a banner saying "Social justice instead of criminal foreigners". In 2020, Deutsches Reichsbräu beer with neo-Nazi imagery was sold in Bad Bibra on Holocaust Memorial Day.

In October 2019, the city council of Dresden passed a motion declaring a "Nazi emergency", signalling that there is a serious problem with the far right in the city.

In February 2020, following an observation of a conspiratorial meeting of a dozen right-wing extremists, those involved were arrested after agreeing to launch attacks on mosques in Germany to trigger a civil war.

The National Democratic Party (NPD) in Germany has made efforts to be incorporated into the environmental movement in an effort to attract new members amongst the younger generations. They have published conservation magazines including Umwelt und Aktiv (Environment and Active). This magazine and others of its kind incorporate both environmentalism and tips as well as far-right propaganda and rhetoric. It's argued by an anonymous member of the Centre for Democratic Culture that this endeavor is in part a rebranding of the NPD. They argue that the party is attempting to become associated with environmentalism and not politics.

Legal issues 

German law forbids the production and exhibitionist movement  of pro-Nazi materials. However, Nazi paraphernalia has been smuggled into the country for decades. Neo-Nazi rock bands such as Landser have been outlawed in Germany, yet bootleg copies of their albums printed in the United States and other countries are still sold in the country. German neo-Nazi websites mostly depend on Internet servers in the US and Canada. They often use symbols that are reminiscent of the swastika, and adopt other symbols used by the Nazis, such as the sun cross, wolf's hook and black sun.

Neo-Nazi groups active in Germany which have attracted government attention include Volkssozialistische Bewegung Deutschlands/Partei der Arbeit banned in 1982, Action Front of National Socialists/National Activists banned in 1983, the Nationalist Front banned in 1992, the Free German Workers' Party, the German Alternative and National Offensive. German Interior Minister Wolfgang Schäuble condemned the Homeland-Faithful German Youth, accusing it of teaching children that anti-immigrant racism and anti-Semitism are acceptable. Homeland-Faithful German Youth claimed that it was centred primarily on "environment, community and homeland", but it has been argued to have links to the National Democratic Party (NPD).

Historian Walter Laqueur wrote in 1996 that the far right NPD cannot be classified as neo-Nazi. In 2004, NPD received 9.1% of the vote in the parliamentary elections for Saxony, thus earning the right to seat state parliament members. The other parties refused to enter discussions with the NPD. In the 2006 parliamentary elections for Mecklenburg-Western Pomerania, the NPD received 7.3% of the vote and six seats in the state parliament. On March 13, 2008,  NPD leader Udo Voigt was charged with  Volksverhetzung ("incitement to hatred", a crime under the German criminal law), for distributing racially charged pamphlets referring to German footballer Patrick Owomoyela, whose father is Nigerian. In 2009, Voigt was given a seven-month suspended sentence and ordered to donate 2,000 euros to UNICEF.

See also 
 Antisemitism in 21st-century Germany
 Neo-Nazism
 Neo-Nazism in Germany
 Reichsbürger movement
 Right-wing terrorism in Germany
 Strafgesetzbuch § 86a
 Terrorism in Germany

References

Further reading
 Ahmed, Reem, and Daniela Pisoiu. "Uniting the far right: how the far-right extremist, New Right, and populist frames overlap on Twitter–-a German case study." European Societies (2020): 1-23 online.
 Bitzan, Renate. "Research on gender and the far right in Germany since 1990: Developments, findings, and future prospects." in Gender and far right politics in Europe (Palgrave Macmillan, Cham, 2017) pp. 65–78 online.
 Bogerts, Lisa, and Maik Fielitz. "'Do You Want Meme War?': Understanding the Visual Memes of the German Far Right."  Digital Culture & Society 1#1 (2019): 137–153. online
 Hardy, Keiran. "Countering right-wing extremism: Lessons from Germany and Norway." Journal of policing, intelligence and counter terrorism 14.3 (2019): 262–279.
 Harvey, Elizabeth. "Visions of the volk: German women and the far right from Kaiserreich to Third Reich." Journal of women's History 16.3 (2004): 152-167 online.
 Koehler, Daniel. Right-wing terrorism in the 21st century: The ‘National Socialist Underground’ and the history of terror from the far-right in Germany (Taylor & Francis, 2016). excerpt
 Macklin, Graham. "Transnational networking on the far right: The case of Britain and Germany." West European Politics 36.1 (2013): 176–198.
 Manthe, Barbara. "On the pathway to violence: West German right-wing terrorism in the 1970s." Terrorism and Political Violence 33.1 (2021): 49–70. https://doi.org/10.1080/09546553.2018.152070
 Minkenberg, Michael. "German unification and the continuity of discontinuities: Cultural change and the far right in east and west." German Politics 3.2 (1994): 169–192.
 Miller-Idriss, Cynthia. Extreme Gone Mainstream: Commercialization and Far Right Youth Culture in Germany (Princeton  UP, 2018) excerpt
 Miller-Idriss, Cynthia. "Soldier, sailor, rebel, rule-breaker: masculinity and the body in the German far right." Gender and Education 29.2 (2017): 199–215.
 Rädel, Jonas. "Two Paradigmatic Views on Right-Wing Populism in East Germany." German Politics and Society 37.4 (2019): 29-42
 Rauchfleisch, Adrian, and Jonas Kaiser. "The German Far-Right on YouTube: An analysis of user overlap and user comments." Journal of Broadcasting & Electronic Media 64.3 (2020): 373–396. online
 Virchow, Fabian. "Performance, emotion, and ideology: On the creation of “collectives of emotion” and worldview in the contemporary German far right." Journal of Contemporary Ethnography 36.2 (2007): 147–164.

Antisemitism in Germany
 
Political movements in Germany
Far-right politics in Europe
Germany
Racism in Germany